San Pier Damiani ai Monti di San Paolo is a 20th-century parochial church and titular church in the southwest suburbs of Rome, dedicated to the 11th-century saint Peter Damian.

History 

San Pier Damiani was built in 1966–70. 

On 5 March 1973, it was made a titular church to be held by a cardinal-deacon. The church was poorly constructed, and had to be rebuilt in 1998–2002. Pope Francis visited in 2017.

Cardinal-Protectors
Pietro Palazzini (1973–1974)
Gustaaf Joos (2003–2004)
Agostino Vallini (2006–present); promoted to cardinal-priest pro hac vice in 2009

References

External links

Titular churches
Roman Catholic churches completed in 1970
20th-century Roman Catholic church buildings in Italy